Lesbian, gay, bisexual and transgender (LGBT) persons in the U.S. state of Delaware enjoy most of the same legal protections as non-LGBT persons. Same-sex sexual activity has been legal in Delaware since January 1, 1973. On January 1, 2012, civil unions became available to same-sex couples, granting them the "rights, benefits, protections, and responsibilities" of married persons. Delaware legalized same-sex marriage on July 1, 2013.

State law bans discrimination on the basis of sexual orientation and gender identity, and the state has legally banned the practice of conversion therapy on minors since July 2018. Delaware is frequently referred to as one of the United States' most LGBT-friendly states. A majority of Delawareans support same-sex marriage.

Laws against same-sex sexual activity
Delaware repealed its sodomy law in July 1972. The repeal of the sodomy law became effective on January 1, 1973.

Recognition of same-sex relationships

In March 2011, state senators David P. Sokola and Melanie George introduced a bill to create civil unions in Delaware. It was approved by the Delaware Legislature. Governor Jack Markell signed the legislation on May 11, 2011, and it took effect on January 1, 2012. In 2012, Delaware issued at least 565 civil union licenses, much higher than advocates had anticipated.

In March 2012, Markell said he thought that the legalization of same-sex marriage in Delaware was "inevitable" and would be passed "probably within the next few years". In September, Representative Pete Schwartzkopf said he expected the General Assembly to vote on same-sex marriage in 2013 and that he would support it, but was uncertain of the legislation's prospects. A bill to allow same-sex marriage and convert civil unions to marriages passed the Delaware House by a vote of 23 to 18 on April 23. The Senate approved it by a vote of 12 to 9 on May 7, and that same day the Governor signed the legislation, which went into effect July 1, 2013.

Adoption and parenting 
Delaware law permits any unmarried adult or married couple to petition a court for adoption of a child. The first second-parent adoption involving a same-sex couple occurred in October 2001. Since January 2012, same-sex couples in a civil union or marriage have had the same adoption rights as opposite-sex couples.

Discrimination protections and hate crime legislation
The University of Delaware's policy on both discrimination and harassment has included sexual orientation since 1990.

Since 2009, Delaware law has prohibited discrimination on the basis of actual or perceived sexual orientation in employment, housing, public accommodations, and other areas. Since 2013, Delaware law has prohibited discrimination on the basis of actual or perceived gender identity in employment, housing, public accommodations, and other areas. Bill SB 97 that prohibits discrimination on the basis of actual or perceived gender identity passed the Senate by a vote of 11-7 on June 6, 2013. The House later passed it by a vote of 24-17 with amendments. The Senate approved the amendments by a vote of 11-9 on June 18, and then a day later it was signed into law by the Governor. The law went into effect immediately.

Governor Jack Markell issued an executive order on August 11, 2009, that protects employees of state's executive branch departments and agencies from discrimination on the basis of sexual orientation or gender identity.

Since 2001, Delaware has imposed additional penalties for committing a violent crime motivated by the victim's actual or perceived sexual orientation. Since 2013, Delaware has imposed additional penalties for committing a violent crime motivated by the victim's actual or perceived gender identity.

HIV medicine and Prep
In June 2021, a law was implemented within Delaware to protect individuals from discrimination based on HIV medicine and Prep.

Loophole and outdated provisions
In May 2021, a bill passed the Delaware Legislature to repeal a 2009 discovered loophole that found to legally prevented sexual orientation discrimination claims for individuals within need of urgent legal protections and security that say - "based solely on just one exclusive sexual orientation". The bill also repeal a small section of gender identity laws that say - "used for an improper purpose" in an outdated provision within the legislation from 2013. The Governor of Delaware John Carney is yet to either sign or veto the bill.

Gender identity and expression
Transgender people are allowed to change their legal gender in Delaware, requiring only the signed statement of a licensed medical provider to change the marker on their state-issued identification. As of February 11, 2017, sex reassignment surgery is no longer an explicit requirement to obtain an amended birth certificate. Instead, a signed affidavit from a medical provider is required, stating that there has been "surgical, hormonal, psychological or other treatment appropriate for the individual for the purpose of gender transition."

In 2015, the Delaware General Assembly passed a law to make it easier for inmates to access and/or change the name on their birth certificates to reflect their gender identity. Previously, inmates could only change their names due to religious beliefs. Democratic Governor Jack Markell signed the bill into law on June 25, 2015. The law became effective immediately.

Since March 26, 2016, Delaware has prohibited discrimination based on gender identity within insurance contracts. This includes sex reassignment surgery.

As of April 2020, Delaware does not have gender X available on drivers licenses. The states of New Jersey, Pennsylvania, Virginia, Washington D.C. and Maryland surrounded by Delaware, all already have gender X available on drivers licenses.

HIV law reform
In April 2017, the Delaware Legislature passed, and Governor John C. Carney Jr. subsequently signed into law, a bill to allow HIV patients to donate to other HIV patients. The law went into effect on January 1, 2018.

Conversion therapy

SB 65, a bill to ban the use of conversion therapy on minors, passed the state Senate by a vote of 12-3 on May 17, 2017, and the state House on June 7, 2018 by a vote of 24-14. The bill was signed into law by the Governor of Delaware, John C. Carney Jr., a month later in July 2018 and went into effect immediately. Conversion therapy has a negative effect on the lives of LGBT people, and can lead to low self-esteem, depression and suicide.

Public opinion
In February 2011, a Public Policy Polling survey found that 48% of Delaware voters supported the legalization of same-sex marriage, while 47% were opposed and 5% were not sure. A March 2011 poll by Lake Research Partners showed that 62% in Delaware favored allowing same-sex couples to form civil unions, while 31% were opposed, and 7% were not sure.

A February 2013 poll, conducted by Global Strategy Group, found that 54% of likely voters supported same-sex marriage, 37% were opposed and 8 percent didn't know or declined to answer the question.

A 2017 Public Religion Research Institute (PRRI) poll found that 58% of Delaware residents supported same-sex marriage, while 27% opposed it and 15% were unsure. The same poll also found that 68% of Delawareans supported an anti-discrimination law covering sexual orientation and gender identity, while 21% were opposed. Furthermore, 60% were against allowing businesses to refuse to serve gay and lesbian people due to religious beliefs, while 28% supported allowing such religiously-based refusals.

Summary table

See also

Politics of Delaware
LGBT rights in the United States
Rights and responsibilities of marriages in the United States
Sarah McBride

References

External links
Delaware Right to Marry

LGBT rights in Delaware